The 1962 Pittsburgh Steelers season was the franchise's 30th in the National Football League.

Regular season

Schedule

Note: Intra-conference opponents are in bold text.

Game summaries

Week 1 (Sunday September 16, 1962): Detroit Lions 

at Tiger Stadium, Detroit, Michigan

 Game time: 
 Game weather: 
 Game attendance: 46,641
 Referee: 
 TV announcers:

Scoring Drives:

 Detroit – Cogdill 1 pass from Plum (Walker kick)
 Pittsburgh – Carpenter 43 pass from Brown (Michaels kick)
 Detroit – Pietrosante 22 run (Walker kick)
 Detroit – Cogdill 21 pass from Plum (Walker kick)
 Detroit – Lewis 1 run (Walker kick)
 Detroit – Lewis 1 run (Walker kick)
 Detroit – FG Walker 44
 Detroit – Studstill 9 pass from Plum (Walker kick)

Week 2 (Sunday September 23, 1962): Dallas Cowboys  

at Cotton Bowl, Dallas, Texas

 Game time: 
 Game weather: 
 Game attendance: 19,478
 Referee: 
 TV announcers:

Scoring Drives:

 Dallas – Lockett 29 pass from LeBaron (Baker kick)
 Pittsburgh – Womack 16 run (Michaels kick)
 Pittsburgh – Dial 38 pass from Layne (Michaels kick)
 Pittsburgh – Johnson 16 pass from Layne (Michaels kick)
 Dallas – Perkins 2 run (Baker kick)
 Pittsburgh – Safety, Dallas holding in end zone
 Dallas – Perkins 6 run (Baker kick)
 Pittsburgh – Womack 3 run (Michaels kick)
 Dallas – Clarke 13 pass from LeBaron (Baker kick)

Week 3 (Sunday September 30, 1962): New York Giants  

at Forbes Field, Pittsburgh, Pennsylvania

 Game time: 
 Game weather: 
 Game attendance: 40,916
 Referee: 
 TV announcers:

Scoring Drives:

 Pittsburgh – Womack 7 run (Michaels kick)
 New York Giants – FG Chandler 23
 Pittsburgh – Mack 28 pass from Layne (Michaels kick)
 New York Giants – Dudley 11 pass from Tittle (Chandler kick)
 Pittsburgh – FG Michaels 41
 New York Giants – Webster 58 pass from Tittle (Chandler kick)
 Pittsburgh – FG Michaels 33
 New York Giants – Gifford 27 pass from Tittle (Chandler kick)
 New York Giants – Shofner 16 pass from Tittle (Chandler kick)
 Pittsburgh – Johnson 1 run (Michaels kick)

Week 4 (Saturday October 6, 1962): Philadelphia Eagles  

at Forbes Field, Pittsburgh, Pennsylvania

 Game time: 
 Game weather: 
 Game attendance: 23,164
 Referee: 
 TV announcers:

Scoring Drives:

 Pittsburgh – FG Michaels 14
 Pittsburgh – Schmitz 24 interception return (Michaels kick)
 Pittsburgh – FG Michaels 10
 Philadelphia – McDonald 46 pass from Jurgensen (Walston kick)

Week 5 (Sunday October 14, 1962): New York Giants  

at Yankee Stadium, The Bronx, New York

 Game time: 
 Game weather: 
 Game attendance: 62,808
 Referee: 
 TV announcers:

Scoring Drives:

 New York Giants – FG Chandler 30
 Pittsburgh – Layne 1 run (Michaels kick)
 Pittsburgh – Johnson 5 pass from Layne (Michaels kick)
 New York Giants – Walton 21 pass from Tittle (Chandler kick)
 Pittsburgh – FG Michaels 16
 Pittsburgh – FG Michaels 9
 New York Giants – Gifford 16 pass from Tittle (Chandler kick)

Week 6 (Sunday October 21, 1962): Dallas Cowboys  

at Forbes Field, Pittsburgh, Pennsylvania

 Game time: 
 Game weather: 
 Game attendance: 23,106
 Referee: 
 TV announcers:

Scoring Drives: Dallas – Perkins 1 run (Baker kick)
 Pittsburgh – Dial 26 pass from Layne (Michaels kick)
 Dallas – Howton 16 pass from LeBaron (Baker kick)
 Pittsburgh – FG Michaels 10
 Dallas – Clark 45 pass from LeBaron (Baker kick)
 Pittsburgh – FG Michaels 40
 Dallas – Clark 3 pass from LeBaron (Baker kick)
 Pittsburgh – Johnson 1 run (Michaels kick)
 Pittsburgh – Dial 9 pass form Layne (Michaels kick)
 Dallas – Clarke 13 pass from LeBaron (Baker kick)
 Dallas Folkins 26 pass from LeBaron (Baker kick)

 Week 7 (Sunday October 28, 1962): Cleveland Browns  

at Forbes Field, Pittsburgh, Pennsylvania

 Game time: 
 Game weather: 
 Game attendance: 35,417
 Referee: 
 TV announcers:Scoring Drives: Cleveland – Costello 21 fumble run (Groza kick)
 Cleveland – FG Groza 37
 Cleveland – Scales 12 run (Groza kick)
 Pittsburgh – Hoak 1 run (Michaels kick)
 Cleveland – Brown 15 pass from Ryan (Groza kick)
 Cleveland – FG Groza 51
 Cleveland – Brown 1 run (Groza kick)
 Cleveland – Green 8 pass from Ryan (Groza kick)
 Pittsburgh – Dial 6 pass from Brown (Michaels kick)

 Week 8 (Sunday November 4, 1962): Minnesota Vikings  

at Forbes Field, Pittsburgh, Pennsylvania

 Game time: 
 Game weather: 
 Game attendance: 14,642
 Referee: 
 TV announcers:Scoring Drives: Pittsburgh – Johnson 2 run (Michaels kick)
 PIttsburgh – Womack 3 run (Michaels kick)
 Minnesota – Mason 37 pass from Tarkenton (Christopherson kick)
 Minnesota – Ferguson 19 pass from Tarkenton  (Christopherson kick)
 Pittsburgh – Safety, Huth recovered fumble in end zone, covered by Stautner
 PIttsburgh – FG Michaels 32
 Pittsburgh – Johnson 2 run (Michaels kick)
 Minnesota Reichow 4 pass from Tarkenton (Christopherson kick)
 Pittsburgh – FG Michaels 38
 Minnesota – Ferguson 59 pass from Tarkenton (Christopherson kick)
 Minnesota – FG Christopherson 42
 Pittsburgh – FG Michaels
 Pittsburgh – Hoak 16 run (Michaels kick)

 Week 9 (Sunday November 11, 1962): St. Louis Cardinals  

at Busch Stadium, St. Louis, Missouri

 Game time: 
 Game weather: 
 Game attendance: 20,265
 Referee: 
 TV announcers:Scoring Drives: St. Louis – Crow 22 run (Perry kick)
 Pittsburgh – FG Michaels 27
 St. Louis – FG Perry 22
 Pittsburgh – Carpenter 9 pass from Layne (kick failed)
 St. Louis – Gautt 1 run (Perry kick)
 Pittsburgh – Hoak 5 run (Michaels kick)
 Pittsburgh – Johnson 5 run (Michaels kick)
 Pittsburgh – FG Michaels 8

 Week 10 (Sunday November 18, 1962): Washington Redskins  

at Forbes Field, Pittsburgh, Pennsylvania

 Game time: 
 Game weather: 
 Game attendance: 21,231
 Referee: 
 TV announcers:Scoring Drives: Pittsburgh – FG Michaels 37
 Washington – Cunningham 10 pass from Snead (Khayat kick)
 Pittsburgh – FG Michaels 18
 Washington – Anderson 46 pass from Snead (Khayat kick)
 Washington – Barnes 32 run (Khayat kick)
 Pittsburgh – Mack 20 pass from Brown (Michaels kick)
 Pittsburgh – Dial 9 pass from Brown (Michaels kick)
 Pittsburgh – FG Michaels 24

 Week 11 (Sunday November 25, 1962): Cleveland Browns  

at Cleveland Municipal Stadium, Cleveland, Ohio

 Game time: 
 Game weather: 
 Game attendance: 53,601
 Referee: 
 TV announcers:Scoring Drives: Cleveland – Brown 34 pass from Ryan (Groza kick)
 Cleveland – Collins 12 pass from Ryan (Groza kick)
 Pittsburgh – Womack 15 run (Michaels kick)
 Cleveland – Renfro 31 pass from Ryan (Groza kick)
 Pittsburgh – Johnson 6 run (Michaels kick)
 Cleveland – Brown 1 run (Groza kick)
 Cleveland – Brown 1 run (Groza kick)

 Week 12 (Sunday December 2, 1962): St. Louis Cardinals  

at Forbes Field, Pittsburgh, Pennsylvania

 Game time: 
 Game weather: 
 Game attendance: 17,285
 Referee: 
 TV announcers:Scoring Drives: Pittsburgh – Daniel 49 interception return (Michaels kick)
 Pittsburgh – FG Michaels 35
 Pittsburgh – FG Michaels 36
 Pittsburgh – FG Michaels 23
 St. Louis – Randle 12 pass from Johnson (Perry kick)
 Pittsburgh – FG Michaels 10

 Week 13 (Sunday December 9, 1962): Philadelphia Eagles  

at Franklin Field, Philadelphia

 Game time: 
 Game weather: 
 Game attendance: 60,671
 Referee: George Rennix
 TV announcers:Scoring Drives: Philadelphia – Retzlaff 7 pass from Jurgensen (Walston kick)
 Pittsburgh – Carpenter 12 pass from Brown (Michaels kick)
 Pittsburgh – FG Michaels 21
 Pittsburgh – Johnson 1 run (Michaels kick)
 Philadelphia – Retzlaff 49 pass from Jurgensen (Walston kick)
 Philadelphia – FG Wittenborn 18
 Pittsburgh – FG Michaels 46
 Pittsburgh – FG Michaels 28
 Pittsburgh – FG Michaels 29

 Week 14 (Sunday December 16, 1962): Washington Redskins  

at D.C. Stadium, Washington, D.C.

 Game time: 
 Game weather: 
 Game attendance: 34,508
 Referee: 
 TV announcers:Scoring Drives:'

 Washington – FG Khayat 33
 Pittsburgh – Dial 39 pass from Layne (Michaels kick)
 Pittsburgh – Hoak 1 run (Michaels kick)
 Washington – James 25 pass from Izo (Khayat kick)
 Pittsburgh – FG Michaels 38
 Pittsburgh – FG Michaels 13
 Pittsburgh – Carpenter 23 pass from Layne (Michaels kick)
 Washington – James 49 pass from Izo (Khayat kick)
 Washington – Anderson 26 pass from Izo (Khayat kick)

Standings

Personnel

Final roster

Roster

Playoff Bowl 

The game matched the conference runners-up for third place in the league and was played three weeks after the end of the regular season (and a week after the championship game). The ten editions of the Playoff Bowl, all held at the Orange Bowl in Miami, Florida, are now considered exhibition games by the NFL, not post-season contests.

References

External links
 1962 Pittsburgh Steelers season at Profootballreference.com 
 1962 Pittsburgh Steelers season statistics at jt-sw.com

Pittsburgh Steelers seasons
Pittsburgh Steelers
Pittsburgh Steel